Adaptive learning, also known as adaptive teaching, is an educational method which uses computer algorithms as well as artificial intelligence to orchestrate the interaction with the learner and deliver customized resources and learning activities to address the unique needs of each learner. In professional learning contexts, individuals may "test out" of some training to ensure they engage with novel instruction. Computers adapt the presentation of educational material according to students' learning needs, as indicated by their responses to questions, tasks and experiences. The technology encompasses aspects derived from various fields of study including computer science, AI, psychometrics, education, psychology, and brain science.

Adaptive learning has been partially driven by a realization that tailored learning cannot be achieved on a large-scale using traditional, non-adaptive approaches. Adaptive learning systems endeavor to transform the learner from passive receptor of information to collaborator in the educational process. Adaptive learning systems' primary application is in education, but another popular application is business training.  They have been designed as desktop computer applications, web applications, and are now being introduced into overall curricula.

History

Adaptive learning or intelligent tutoring has its origins in the artificial-intelligence movement and began gaining popularity in the 1970s.  At that time, it was commonly accepted that computers would eventually achieve the human ability of adaptivity.  In adaptive learning, the basic premise is that the tool or system will be able to adjust to the student/user's learning method, which results in a better and more effective learning experience for the user.  Back in the 70's the main barrier was the cost and size of the computers, rendering the widespread application impractical.  Another hurdle in the adoption of early intelligent systems was that the user interfaces were not conducive to the learning process. The start of the work on adaptive and intelligent learning systems is usually traced back to the SCHOLAR system that offered adaptive learning for the topic of geography of South America. A number of other innovative systems appeared within five years. A good account of the early work on adaptive learning and intelligent tutoring systems can be found in the classic book "Intelligent Tutoring Systems".

Technology and methodology

Adaptive learning systems have traditionally been divided into separate components or 'models'.  While different model groups have been presented, most systems include some or all of the following models (occasionally with different names):

 Expert model – The model with the information which is to be taught
 Student model – The model which tracks and learns about the student
 Instructional model – The model which actually conveys the information
 Instructional environment – The user interface for interacting with the system

Expert model

The expert model stores information about the material which is being taught.  This can be as simple as the solutions for the question set but it can also include lessons and tutorials and, in more sophisticated systems, even expert methodologies to illustrate approaches to the questions.

Adaptive learning systems which do not include an expert model will typically incorporate these functions in the instructional model.

Student model

The simplest means of determining a student's skill level is the method employed in CAT (computerized adaptive testing).  In CAT, the subject is presented with questions that are selected based on their level of difficulty in relation to the presumed skill level of the subject.  As the test proceeds, the computer adjusts the subject's score based on their answers, continuously fine-tuning the score by selecting questions from a narrower range of difficulty.

An algorithm for a CAT-style assessment is simple to implement.  A large pool of questions is amassed and rated according to difficulty, through expert analysis, experimentation, or a combination of the two.  The computer then performs what is essentially a binary search, always giving the subject a question which is halfway between what the computer has already determined to be the subject's maximum and minimum possible skill levels.  These levels are then adjusted to the level of the difficulty of the question, reassigning the minimum if the subject answered correctly, and the maximum if the subject answered incorrectly.  Obviously, a certain margin for error has to be built in to allow for scenarios where the subject's answer is not indicative of their true skill level but simply coincidental.  Asking multiple questions from one level of difficulty greatly reduces the probability of a misleading answer, and allowing the range to grow beyond the assumed skill level can compensate for possible misevaluations.

A further extension of identifying weaknesses in terms of concepts is to program the student model to analyze incorrect answers.  This is especially applicable for multiple choice questions.  Consider the following example:

Q.  Simplify:  

a)  Can't be simplified
b)  
c)  ...
d)  ...

Clearly, a student who answers (b) is adding the exponents and failing to grasp the concept of like terms.  In this case, the incorrect answer provides additional insight beyond the simple fact that it is incorrect.

Instructional model

The instructional model generally looks to incorporate the best educational tools that technology has to offer (such as multimedia presentations) with expert teacher advice for presentation methods.  The level of sophistication of the instructional model depends greatly on the level of sophistication of the student model.  In a CAT-style student model, the instructional model will simply rank lessons in correspondence with the ranks for the question pool.  When the student's level has been satisfactorily determined, the instructional model provides the appropriate lesson.  The more advanced student models which assess based on concepts need an instructional model which organizes its lessons by concept as well.  The instructional model can be designed to analyze the collection of weaknesses and tailor a lesson plan accordingly.

When the incorrect answers are being evaluated by the student model, some systems look to provide feedback to the actual questions in the form of 'hints'.  As the student makes mistakes, useful suggestions pop up such as "look carefully at the sign of the number".  This too can fall in the domain of the instructional model, with generic concept-based hints being offered based on concept weaknesses, or the hints can be question-specific in which case the student, instructional, and expert models all overlap.

Implementations

Learning management system
Many learning management systems have incorporated various adaptive learning features. A learning management system (LMS) is a software application for the administration, documentation, tracking, reporting and delivery of educational courses, training programs, or learning and development programs. Adaptive learning systems have previously been used, for instance, to help students develop their argumentative writing performance (Argument Mining).

Distance learning
Adaptive learning systems can be implemented on the Internet for use in distance learning and group collaboration.

The field of distance learning is now incorporating aspects of adaptive learning. Initial systems without adaptive learning were able to provide automated feedback to students who are presented questions from a preselected question bank. That approach however lacks the guidance which teachers in the classroom can provide. Current trends in distance learning call for the use of adaptive learning to implement intelligent dynamic behavior in the learning environment.

During the time a student spends learning a new concept they are tested on their abilities and databases track their progress using one of the models. The latest generation of distance learning systems take into account the students' answers and adapt themselves to the student's cognitive abilities using a concept called 'cognitive scaffolding'. Cognitive scaffolding is the ability of an automated learning system to create a cognitive path of assessment from lowest to highest based on the demonstrated cognitive abilities.

A current successful implementation of adaptive learning in web-based distance learning is the Maple engine of WebLearn by RMIT university. WebLearn is advanced enough that it can provide assessment of questions posed to students even if those questions have no unique answer like those in the Mathematics field. Another advanced adaptive platform implementation is Palearne that specialized in teaching programming languages for children. Palearne  analyze the user emotional states in their algorithm along with other parameters and provide the user the most accurate learning material according to their current state and level. Palearne platform also able to understand the context of the user mistakes and offer him appropriate help.

Adaptive learning can be incorporated to facilitate group collaboration within distance learning environments like forums or resource sharing services. Some examples of how adaptive learning can help with collaboration include automated grouping of users with the same interests, and personalization of links to information sources based on the user's stated interests or the user's surfing habits.

Educational game design

In 2014, an educational researcher concluded a multi-year study of adaptive learning for educational game design. The research developed and validated the ALGAE (Adaptive Learning GAme dEsign) model, a comprehensive adaptive learning model based on game design theories and practices, instructional strategies, and adaptive models. The research extended previous researching in game design, instructional strategies, and adaptive learning, combining those three components into a single complex model.

The study resulted in the development of an adaptive educational game design model to serve as a guide for game designers, instructional designers, and educators with the goal of increasing learning outcomes. Survey participants validated the value of the ALGAE model and provided specific insights on the model's construction, use, benefits, and challenges. The current ALGAE model is based on these insights. The model now serves as a guideline for the design and development of educational computer games.

The model's applicability is assessed as being cross-industry including government and military agencies/units, game industry, and academia. The model's actual value and the appropriate implementation approach (focused or unfocused) will be fully realized as the ALGAE model's adoption becomes more widespread.

Development tools
While adaptive learning features are often mentioned in the marketing materials of tools, the range of adaptivity can be dramatically different.

Entry-level tools tend to focus on determining the learner's pathway based on simplistic criteria such as the learner's answer to a multiple choice question.  A correct answer may take the learner to Path A, whereas an incorrect answer may take them to Path B.  While these tools provide an adequate method for basic branching, they are often based on an underlying linear model whereby the learner is simply being redirected to a point somewhere along a predefined line.  Due to this, their capabilities fall short of true adaptivity.

At the other end of the spectrum, there are advanced tools which enable the creation of very complex adaptions based on any number of complex conditions.  These conditions may relate to what the learner is currently doing, prior decisions, behavioral tracking, interactive and external activities to name a few.  These higher end tools generally have no underlying navigation as they tend to utilize AI methods such as an inference engine.  Due to the fundamental design difference advanced tools are able to provide rich assessment capabilities.  Rather than taking a simple multiple choice question, the learner may be presented with a complex simulation where a number of factors are considered to determine how the learner should adapt.

Popular tools
 Qualtrics

See also 
 Adaptive hypermedia
 Computerized adaptive testing
 Educational software
 Intelligent tutoring systems
 Learning management system
 Personalized learning
 Smart learning
 Validated learning

References

Learning methods
Educational software